Ramridge End is a small suburb in the east of Luton, in the Luton district, in the ceremonial county of Bedfordshire, England. The area is roughly bounded by Brays Road to the north, Someries Hill to the south, Ashcroft Road to the west, and Wigmore Lane to the east.

History
The area was a former hamlet before being engulfed by Luton. Much of the land in the area was part of Ramridge End Farm, which was owned by a William Barber in the 19th century.

Local area
The local area is mainly residential, although Someries Infant and Junior Schools are in the area. There are also allotments on Wigmore Lane, and a post office and shop at the corner of Wigmore Lane and Croft Road.

Politics 
Ramridge End is on the border of the Round Green and Wigmore wards.

The wards form part of the parliamentary constituency of Luton South and the MP is Rachel Hopkins (Labour).

Local attractions

Local newspapers
Two weekly newspapers cover Ramridge End, although they are not specific to the area. 

They are the:
 Herald and Post
 Luton News

References 

 Local History Book - The Story of Round Green by Barbara M. Benson

Areas of Luton